Emily Harris may refer to:
 Emily Harris (born 1947), American criminal
 Emily Harris (artist) (1836–1925), New Zealand artist
 Emily Marion Harris (1844–1900), British novelist and poet

See also
 Emil Harris, police chief in Los Angeles, California
 Emily Harrison, American actress
 Emmylou Harris, American singer, songwriter, and musician